Thorunna speciosa is a species of sea slug, a dorid nudibranch, a shell-less marine gastropod mollusk in the family Chromodorididae.

Distribution 
This species was described from Halifax Point, Port Stephens, New South Wales, Australia.

Description

References

Chromodorididae
Gastropods described in 1990